The Journal of African Archaeology is a biannual peer-reviewed academic journal covering archaeological studies on Africa. It was established by Sonja Magnavita in 2003. From 2003 to 2016, the Centre for Interdisciplinary African Studies and the Department of African Archaeology and Archaeobotany of Goethe University Frankfurt published it in association with Africa Magna Verlag. Since 2017, the departments publish it in association with Brill Publishers.

Abstracting and indexing
The journal is abstracted and indexed in:
Anthropological Literature
Arts and Humanities Citation Index
Current Contents/Arts & Humanities
EBSCO databases
International Bibliography of Periodical Literature
International Bibliography of the Social Sciences
Scopus

Editors-in-chief
The following persons are or have been editor-in-chief:
Katherine Grillo (2018–present)

Sonja Magnavita

References

External links

Publications established in 2003
Archaeology journals
African history journals
Goethe University Frankfurt
Brill Publishers academic journals
Biannual journals
English-language journals
Delayed open access journals